Moulton railway station was a railway station in what is now the Richmondshire district of North Yorkshire, England. It was situated near the village of North Cowton.

Moulton was the Eryholme-Richmond branch line which was opened in 1846 by the York and Newcastle Railway Company. The line was closed for passengers in 1969 and completely a year later.

This was to avoid confusion with a now disused station on the East Coast Main Line named Cowton serving the nearby village of East Cowton.

Moulton station house still survives, it is now used as a residential property, but the platform clock can still be seen on the wall.

The Richmond bound platform now forms part of the boundary wall to station house. The Darlington-bound platform still stands intact, though it is heavily overgrown with trees, bushes and bramble thickets.

The track bed is now used as an access road for a nearby smallholding, it is not officially recognised as a public right-of-way, though it has been used as a scenic footpath by local people for over 20 years.

See also
List of closed railway lines in Great Britain
List of closed railway stations in Britain

References

Sources

External links

 Moulton Halt, SubBrit disused stations project
 Moulton station on navigable 1947 O. S. map

Disused railway stations in North Yorkshire
Railway stations in Great Britain opened in 1846
Railway stations in Great Britain closed in 1969
1846 establishments in England
Former North Eastern Railway (UK) stations
Beeching closures in England